Nardodipace is a comune (municipality) in the Province of Vibo Valentia in the Italian region Calabria, located about  southwest of Catanzaro and about  southeast of Vibo Valentia.

Nardodipace borders the following municipalities: Caulonia, Fabrizia (to which it was united until 1901), Martone, Mongiana, Pazzano, Roccella Ionica, Stilo.

References

External links

Cities and towns in Calabria